Ogilbia is a genus of viviparous brotulas. The generic name honours the Australian naturalist James Douglas Ogilby (1853-1925), for his contribution to the knowledge of the fishes of Australia.

Species
There are currently 18 recognized species in this genus:
 Ogilbia boehlkei Møller, Schwarzhans & J. G. Nielsen, 2005 (Boehlke's coralbrotula)
 Ogilbia boydwalkeri Møller, Schwarzhans & J. G. Nielsen, 2005 (Walker's coralbrotula)
 Ogilbia cayorum Evermann & Kendall, 1898 (Key brotula)
 Ogilbia cocoensis Møller, Schwarzhans & J. G. Nielsen, 2005 (Coco coralbrotula)
 Ogilbia davidsmithi Møller, Schwarzhans & J. G. Nielsen, 2005 (Smith's coralbrotula)
 Ogilbia deroyi (Poll & Van Mol, 1966) (Deroy's cusk-eel)
 Ogilbia galapagosensis (Poll & LeLeup, 1965) (Galapagos cusk-eel)
 Ogilbia jeffwilliamsi Møller, Schwarzhans & J. G. Nielsen, 2005 (Williams' coralbrotula)
 Ogilbia jewettae Møller, Schwarzhans & J. G. Nielsen, 2005 (Jewett's coralbrotula)
 Ogilbia mccoskeri Møller, Schwarzhans & J. G. Nielsen, 2005 (McCosker's coralbrotula)
 Ogilbia nigromarginata Møller, Schwarzhans & J. G. Nielsen, 2005 (Dark-finned coralbrotula)
 Ogilbia nudiceps Møller, Schwarzhans & J. G. Nielsen, 2005 (Naked-headed coralbrotula)
 Ogilbia robertsoni Møller, Schwarzhans & J. G. Nielsen, 2005 (Robertson's coralbrotula)
 Ogilbia sabaji Møller, Schwarzhans & J. G. Nielsen, 2005 (Sabaji's coralbrotula)
 Ogilbia sedorae Møller, Schwarzhans & J. G. Nielsen, 2005 (Sedor's coralbrotula)
 Ogilbia suarezae Møller, Schwarzhans & J. G. Nielsen, 2005 (Suarez' coralbrotula)
 Ogilbia tyleri Møller, Schwarzhans & J. G. Nielsen, 2005 (Tyler's coralbrotula)
 Ogilbia ventralis (T. N. Gill, 1863) (Gulf cusk-eel)

References

Bythitidae
Taxa named by David Starr Jordan
Taxonomy articles created by Polbot